Pedro de Ortega y Sotomayor (died 1658) was a Roman Catholic prelate who served as Bishop of Cuzco (1651–1658), Bishop of Arequipa (1647–1651), and Bishop of Trujillo (1645–1647).

Biography
Pedro de Ortega y Sotomayor was born in Lima, Peru. 
On 19 February 1645, he was selected by the King of Spain as Bishop of Trujillo and on 21 August 1645 he was confirmed by Pope Innocent X. 
On 30 September 1646, he was consecrated bishop by Pedro de Villagómez Vivanco, Archbishop of Lima. 
On 26 December 1647, he was appointed during the papacy of Pope Innocent X as Bishop of Arequipa.
On 27 November 1651, he was appointed during the papacy of Pope Innocent X as Bishop of Cuzco. 
He served as Bishop of Cuzco until his death in 1658.

While a priest, he assisted in the consecration of Francisco de la Serna, Bishop of Paraguay (1637), and Gaspar de Villarroel, Bishop of Santiago de Chile (1638).

References

External links and additional sources
 (for Chronology of Bishops) 
 (for Chronology of Bishops) 
 (for Chronology of Bishops) 
 (for Chronology of Bishops) 
 (for Chronology of Bishops) 
 (for Chronology of Bishops) 

17th-century Roman Catholic bishops in Peru
Bishops appointed by Pope Innocent X
1658 deaths
Roman Catholic bishops of Arequipa
Roman Catholic bishops of Cusco
Roman Catholic bishops of Trujillo